The 1999–2000 EPIHL was the 3rd season of the English Premier Ice Hockey League, the sport's third tier, which is split into a Premier Division and a regionalized Division One.

There is no automatic promotion to the  British National League from the English League.

In the Premier Division, teams met six times, three at home and three away, while in Division One sides played one home, one away in the North and two home, two away in the South.

Chelmsford Chieftains won the English Premier Ice Hockey League's first three-leg grand slam with successes in the league, play-offs and Millennium Cup.

Final league standings

English Premier Ice Hockey League

Division One North

Division One South

Leading Scorers

English Premier Ice Hockey League

Division One North

Division One South

External links
Official EPIHL website

1999–2000 in English ice hockey